Nenana may refer to:

 Nenana (steamer), a five-deck, western river, sternwheel paddleship
 Nenana Depot, an Alaska Railroad depot built in 1922
 Nenana Municipal Airport, a city-owned public-use airport located one mile south of the central business district of Nenana
 Nenana River, a tributary of the Tanana River
 Nenana Valley, an archaeological site in the Yukon-Koyukuk Census Area of Alaska
 Nenana, Alaska, a Home Rule City in the Yukon-Koyukuk Census Area of the Unorganized Borough in the Interior of the U.S. state of Alaska